The Trucks family is an American family which, including marriages, includes five professional musicians and one professional baseball player.

First generation
Virgil Trucks (1917–2013), professional baseball player

Second generation
Butch Trucks (1947-2017), drummer and founding member of the Allman Brothers Band, nephew of Virgil Trucks

Third generation
Derek Trucks (born 1979), guitarist and member of the Allman Brothers Band and Tedeschi Trucks Band, nephew of Butch Trucks and brother of Duane Trucks
Duane Trucks (born 1988), drummer and member of Widespread Panic and Hard Working Americans, nephew of Butch Trucks and brother of Derek Trucks
Vaylor Trucks, guitarist and member of The Yeti Trio, son of Butch Trucks and cousin of Derek Trucks and Duane Trucks
Melody Trucks, percussion and vocalist for the Melody Trucks Band, daughter of Butch Trucks, sister of Vaylor Trucks, and cousin of Derek Trucks and Duane Trucks

Spouses
Susan Tedeschi (born 1970), guitarist/vocalist and member of the Tedeschi Trucks Band, wife of Derek Trucks
Cameron Herring, wife of drummer Duane Trucks and daughter of his bandmate, Widespread Panic lead guitarist Jimmy Herring.

References

 
American families